The Sepang 1000 km Endurance Race is a  endurance racing event held annually since 2009 at the Sepang International Circuit in December. The race was created out of the success of the 12-hour Malaysia Merdeka Endurance Race, but unlike the MMER is a touring car race and is limited to cars with an engine capacity of under . Originally 1900 cc was the upper limit but this was reduced in 2011. Despite the engine power advantage of the larger-engined cars, Class 2  cars have won two of three races held thus far.

Classes
The race is divided into 2 classes, for cars of 1800 cc and a second class for cars of 1600 cc or less.

Class 1
FIA Article 254 - Group N Cars 1601cc to 1800cc
FIA Article 255 - Group A Cars 1601cc to 1800cc
FIA Article 277 - National Series Production Cars 1601cc to 1800cc
(2,500 units minimum production)

Class 2
FIA Article 254 - Group N Cars up to 1600cc
FIA Article 255 - Group A Cars up to 1600cc
FIA Article 277 - National Series Production Cars up to 1600cc
(2,500 units minimum production)

Overall Winners

Multiple race winners

References

Touring car races
Auto races in Malaysia